René Stüssi (born December 13, 1978) is a former Swiss professional ice hockey player, who played right winger.

Stüssi played a total of 227 regular season games in the Nationalliga A, playing for EHC Kloten, ZSC Lions, EV Zug, EHC Chur and EHC Basel. He finished his career in 2017 with Pikes EHC Oberthurgau in the Regio League.

Stüssi was drafted 209th overall by the Mighty Ducks of Anaheim in the 1997 NHL Entry Draft but he remained in Switzerland throughout his career.

References

External links

1978 births
Living people
EHC Basel players
EHC Bülach players
ECH Chur players
EV Zug players
HC Ajoie players
HC Thurgau players
EHC Kloten players
Anaheim Ducks draft picks
Swiss ice hockey right wingers
ZSC Lions players